Gunnar Andresen (5 December 1923 – 21 October 2000) was a Norwegian footballer. He played in three matches for the Norway national football team from 1947 to 1952.

References

External links
 

1923 births
2000 deaths
Norwegian footballers
Norway international footballers
Place of birth missing
Association football forwards
Larvik Turn players